Solomon Commey Oblitey (born 23 August 2001) is a Ghanaian footballer who currently plays as a midfielder for Ghana Premier League side Bofoakwa Tano F.C.

Career

Berekum Chelsea 
Oblitey started his career DC United a Ghana Division Two League side in Sunyani. In July 2017, he secured a move to Ghana Premier League side Berekum Chelsea F.C. ahead of the 2017 Ghana Premier League season. He made his debut on 9 July 2017, after coming on in 72nd minute for Haruna Abdul Ganiyu in a 1–1 draw against International Allies. He made three league matches at the end of the season. His contract with the club was made permanent and extended for three years until 2021. He played 7 league matches the following season, as the league was brought to an abrupt end due to the GFA Number 12 scandal. His play time during the 2019 GFA Special Competition was limited to eight matches mostly coming from the bench, however he scored his debut league goal in the 27th minute of a 2–1 loss to Medeama SC on 1 May 2019. Over the course of the next two seasons, he played a combined seven league matches before leaving the club in March 2021. In total, he played twenty five league matches and scored one goal during his time at the Berekum.

Bofoakwa Tano 
After his contract with Berekum Chelsea ended in March 2021, he signed for Ghana Division One League side Bofoakwa Tano.

References

External links 
 

Association football midfielders
Living people
2001 births
Ghanaian footballers
Berekum Chelsea F.C. players
Bofoakwa Tano F.C. players
Ghana Premier League players